Clathrin coat assembly protein AP180 is a protein that in humans is encoded by the SNAP91 gene.

References

Further reading